Sharon Roberta Peterson (born November 27, 1942) is an American former volleyball player. She played for the United States national team at the 1964 Summer Olympics, the 1967 Pan American Games, and the 1968 Summer Olympics. She was born in Inglewood, California.

References

1942 births
Living people
Olympic volleyball players of the United States
Volleyball players at the 1964 Summer Olympics
Volleyball players at the 1968 Summer Olympics
Volleyball players at the 1967 Pan American Games
Pan American Games gold medalists for the United States
Sportspeople from Inglewood, California
American women's volleyball players
Pan American Games medalists in volleyball
Medalists at the 1967 Pan American Games
Long Beach State Beach women's volleyball players